Marquis Cheng or Marquess Cheng may refer to these ancient Chinese rulers:

Marquis Cheng of Jin ( 9th century BC)
Marquess Cheng of Zhao (died 350 BC)

See also
King Cheng (disambiguation)
Duke Cheng (disambiguation)